The Warrington Perambulating Library has been described by historian Ian Orton as "one of the most revolutionary library advances of the nineteenth century". Among the earliest mobile libraries in the UK, it was set up by the Warrington Mechanics' Institute in Cheshire, England in 1858. Keen to increase borrowing from its library, the institute determined in the summer of that year to raise money for the purchase of a one-horse van, which it planned to fill with books and send each week "to every door in Warrington and the vicinity".

The idea was taken up enthusiastically by local residents, who organised a flower show and bazaar to raise funds. An October 1858 account in the Warrington Guardian reported that:

The event raised £250 (equivalent to £ in ), allowing the perambulating library to begin touring the streets of Warrington on 15 November 1858. It was an immediate success, and resulted in the number of books borrowed from the institute's library increasing from 3000 a year to 12,000. The service continued until 1872.

References

Notes

Citations

Bibliography

History of Warrington
Mobile libraries
1858 establishments in England
1872 disestablishments in England
Libraries in Cheshire
Horse transportation
Libraries established in the 1850s